Love is a 2008 Indonesian anthology romance film directed by Kabir Bhatia as a remake of the 2006 film Cinta. The film marked the last appearance of actor Sophan Sophiaan before his death in 2008. Sophiaan appeared opposite his real-life wife, Widyawati.

Plot
With Jakarta as the background, the film shares the stories of 5 different couples of various ages, social, and economic groups.

Background
The project began filming in 2007, and was at first accused of being a copy of the 2003 British romantic comedy film Love Actually.  Writer Titien Wattimena denied that it was a copy, and Christo Damar of 'The Nature Producers' stated that while Love began with the same basic precept, it was actually based upon the 2006 film Cinta, with perhaps a 10% similarity to its predecessor, and 90% being a different story as now set in Jakarta.  The composer Erwin Gutawa contributed to the film.

Cast
Laudya Cynthia Bella as Dinda
Irwansyah as Restu
Acha Septriasa as Iin
Darius Sinathriya as Awin
Fauzi Baadilla as Rama
Luna Maya as Tere
Sophan Sophiaan as Nugroho
Surya Saputra as Gilang
Widyawati as Lestari
Wulan Guritno as Miranda
Ajeng Sardi as Dewi
Aryo Wahab as Rio
Gading Marten as Arif
Marsha Aruan as Icha
Linda Ramadhanty as Ayu
Nur Saptahadi as Chandra
Al Fathir Muchtar as Omar
Marsha Timothy as Tia
Joko Anwar as Arya

Awards and nominations
This movie won "Movie of the Year" at the Guardians e-Awards and nominated for "Favorite Film" at the Indonesian Movie Awards.

Album

Ost. Love is a compilation album released in 2008 to accompany the film of the same title, Love. The soundtrack album has 9 songs. The hit song single Sempurna sung by Andra and The BackBone was recycling song by Gita Gutawa.

List Song
 Sempurna (second version) - Gita Gutawa
 Anugerah Terindah Yang Pernah Ku Miliki - Sheila On 7
 Oo..Oo..Oo.. - Gigi
 Kasih Tak Sampai - Padi
 Scoring Love 2 - Erwin Gutawa
 Dua Hati Menjadi Satu - Gita Gutawa feat Dafi
 Ku Ingin Engkau - Vagetoz
 Sempurna (first version) - Gita Gutawa
 Scoring Love 1 - Gita Gutawa

Reception
Iskandar Liem of the Jakarta Post wote that the film might have seemed to simply be a remake of the earlier Cinta, using notable stars as a means of attracting money at the box office, but offered that "despite its flaws, [the film] proves to be an emotional reflection on affairs of the heart.  Speaking toward the work of Sophan Sophiaan in the film, Liem wrote it was "refreshing to see senior thespian Sophan venturing outside his usual stern patriarchal roles with his touching portrayal of vulnerability."  He acknowledged the work of Widyawati, Sophiaan's real-life wife, in her role as Lestari, writing "her character's generosity of spirit genuinely glows from her". He shared that of the cast, the work of Acha Septriasa was a "standout performance", writing "her performance is so fluid and organic, it's hard to believe this is the same grating actress who shamelessly turned on the waterworks in Love is Cinta".  Liem concluded his review by summarizing "In spite of its flaws, Love still gave this jaded viewer a warm fuzzy feeling all over as the credits rolled".

References

External links
 

2008 films
Indonesian romantic drama films
2000s Indonesian-language films
2000s romance films
Films shot in Indonesia
Films directed by Kabir Bhatia
Remakes of Indonesian films
Anthology films